Henning Kraggerud (born 23 June 1973) is a Norwegian musician and composer.

Career 
Kraggerud was born in Oslo. He studied with Camilla Wicks, Emanuel Hurwitz, and Stephan Barratt-Due, before embarking on a career that has brought solo appearances thought Europe, Russia and United States. He made his American debut as a recitalist in 1998 at Carnegie Hall, and has collaborated in recitals and chamber-music performances. A leader-soloist of chamber orchestras and sinfoniettas, Kraggerud is skilled at improvisation, and is an experienced composer, having written music arrangements and his own cadenzas.

His recordings for Naxos include Grieg's Violin Sonatas and Norwegian Favorites for violin and orchestra. A recipient of Norway's prestigious Grieg Prize, Kraggerud was appointed the Bergen International Festival Artist-Residence in 2004. In 2011, Kraggerud took over from Leif Ove Andsnes as co-Artistic Director of the Risør Festival of Chamber Music. From 2012, Kraggerud became Artistic Director of the Tromsø Chamber Orchestra.

Kraggerud performs both on violin and viola at the major international festivals, recent collaborations have included a Szymanowski Focus at Wigmore Hall in London and Zankel Hall in New York City, curated by Piotr Anderszewski, and performances at the Verbier Festival with Joshua Bell, Leonidas Kavakos and Martha Argerich. In 2011 he appeared at the Hong Kong International Chamber Music Festival and the Seoul Spring Festival. He joined colleagues at the Rio International Chamber Music Week in Brazil and the Stavanger International Chamber Music Festival in 2012. Along with Imogen Cooper and Adrian Brendel he appears at LSO St Luke’s in the BBC’s chamber concert series.

Henning Kraggerud plays on a 1744 Guarneri del Gesù.

Honors 
2007: «Ole Bull Award», for his work on the music of Ole Bull
2008: Spellemannprisen in the class Classical music, for the album Eugène Ysaÿe: Six Sonatas For Solo Violin
2011: Gammlengprisen in the class Art music

Discography (in selection)

Solo albums 
2008: Eugène Ysaÿe: Six Sonatas For Solo Violin (Simax Classics)

As soloist 
1997: Grieg: Fiolinsonater Nr. 1-3 (Naxos Music), with Helge Kjekshus (piano)
1999: Bull, Halvorsen, Grieg, Sinding, Svendsen: Norwegian Violin Favourites (Naxos Music), with «Razumovsky Symphony Orchestra», conductor: Bjarte Engeset
2003: Johan Svendsen: String Quartet • String Quintet (cpo), with Oslo String Quartet
2004: Sibelius, Sinding: Violin Concertos (Naxos Music), with Oslo String Quartet
2008: Sinding: Musikk For Fiolin Og Klavér (Naxos Music), with Christian Ihle Hadland
2009: Christian Sinding: Music For Violin And Piano • 1 (Suite Im Alten Stil, Op. 10 • Waltzes, Op. 59) (Naxos Music), with Christian Ihle Hadland
2009: Christian Sinding: Music For Violin And Piano • 2 (Naxos Music), with Christian Ihle Hadland
2011: Mozart: Divertimento In E Flat Major (Naxos Music), with Lars Anders Tomter (viola) & Christoph Richter (cello)
2012: Nordic Violin Favourites (Naxos Music), with «Dalasinfoniettan», conductor: Bjarte Engeset
2016: Mozart: Violin Concertos Nos. 3, 4 and 5 (Naxos Music), with Norwegian Chamber Orchestra

Collaborative works 
2012: Last Spring (ATC), with Bugge Wesseltoft

References 

1973 births
Living people
Male violinists
20th-century Norwegian violinists
21st-century Norwegian violinists
People educated at Oslo Waldorf School
Musicians from Oslo
Eurovision Young Musicians Finalists
Spellemannprisen winners
Barratt Due Institute of Music alumni
Academic staff of the Barratt Due Institute of Music
21st-century violinists
20th-century Norwegian male musicians
21st-century Norwegian male musicians